The Qaqqaarsuk deposit is a large niobium mine located in Qeqqata in southern Greenland. Qaqqaarsuk represents one of the largest niobium reserves in Greenland having estimated reserves of 3.5 million tonnes of ore grading 0.5% niobium.

See also
 Motzfeldt mine

References 

Niobium mines in Greenland